"Get Down on It" is a 1981 song by American band Kool & the Gang. It was originally released on their Something Special album in 1981. The single was certified Gold by the RIAA.

Record World called it a "kinetic dancer" and said that the "chant-like chorus hook is contagious."

Track listing

Charts
The song hit the top 10 of the US Pop and R&B charts in Billboard in early 1982. It entered the UK charts in December 1981 and reached number three, their highest-charting hit in the UK at that time. It spent a total of 12 weeks on the British play list. Ten years later, it was re-released in the UK charts – on the Mercury label – but only charted for a week (at number 69).

Weekly charts

Year-end charts

Charts for Eiffel 65 remix

Certifications

Cover versions

Peter Andre version

"Get Down on It" was re-recorded and released as the third overall single from English-Australian singer Peter Andre's second studio album, Natural. The single features the band Past to Present and reached No. 5 in Australia and No. 1 in New Zealand, achieving Platinum status there in April 1996.

Track listings
Australian CD1
 "Get Down on It"
 "Tell Me When"
 "Get Down on It" (The One World Mix)

Australian CD2 and cassette single
 "Get Down on It" (single version)
 "Get Down on It" (The One World Mix)
 "Get Down on It" (instrumental)
 "Get Down on It" (extended version)
 "Get Down on It" (The Toyboy Mix)
 "Get Down on It" (no rap)

Charts
Weekly charts

Year-end charts

Certifications

Blue version

In 2004, British pop group Blue recorded the song as a collaboration with Kool & the Gang and released it as the second single from their greatest hits compilation Best of Blue. This version also features American rapper Lil' Kim. Although the song did not chart in Blue's native United Kingdom, it became a moderate hit in mainland Europe, especially in Spain, where it reached number three and spent eight weeks in the top 20.

Track listings
European CD1
 "Get Down on It" (radio edit) – 3:36
 "Get Down on It" (Obi & Josh mix) – 4:01

European CD2
 "Get Down on It" (radio edit) – 3:36
 "Get Down on It" (Obi & Josh mix) – 4:01
 "Elements" – 3:40
 "Welcome to the Show" – 3:30
 "Ballad Medley" – 5:24
 Special content

Charts

Other versions and sampling
 In 1997, German rapper and DJ Der Wolf covered it in German in the song "Gib's doch gar nicht".
 My Morning Jacket covered the song at their midnight set at Bonnaroo 2008. The concert featured many special covers, including "Hit It and Quit It" and "Across 110th Street".
 In 2008, the song was performed by Westlife on their Back Home Tour.
 The Canadian-American boy band 3Deep recorded a cover of the song in 1999 for their debut album Yes Yes Yes...No No No, featuring guest vocals from Canadian hip hop artist Michie Mee.
This song was sampled by Snoop Dogg in "We Just Wanna Party with You" (1997) for the Men in Black soundtrack.
This song was sampled by 98 Degrees in "Do You Wanna Dance" from 98 Degrees and Rising.
Nelly's "Ride wit Me", though it does not strictly sample "Get Down on It", does use an identical chord progression to the Kool & The Gang selection, especially in the refrain.
This song was sampled by The Game in "Up on the Wall" from The Documentary 2.5.

See also
List of post-disco artists and songs
Get down

References

1981 songs
1981 singles
1982 singles
2005 singles
1996 singles
Blue (English band) songs
Peter Andre songs
Kool & the Gang songs
Funk songs
Post-disco songs
Number-one singles in New Zealand
Number-one singles in South Africa
Song recordings produced by Stargate (record producers)
Songs written by James "J.T." Taylor
Songs written by Ronald Bell (musician)
De-Lite Records singles
Songs written by Claydes Charles Smith
Songs written by Robert "Kool" Bell
Songs written by Eumir Deodato
Innocent Records singles
Virgin Records singles